Tirachoidea biceps is a species of stick insect in the order Phasmatodea. It is endemic to Java, Peninsula Malaysia, and Sumatra. Females of this species average  and are apterous. Although males are fully winged, their flight capability is poor. Tirachoidea biceps was previously known as Pharnacia but is distinguishable by two bumps on their hind head.

References

External links
 Phasmid Study Group: Tirachoidea biceps

Phasmatidae
Insects described in 1908
Phasmatodea of Malesia